Pietro Amato is a French horn player with the rock bands Torngat, Bell Orchestre, and The Luyas.  He has also performed with Arcade Fire.

Career

In 2001, Amato, along with keyboardist Mathieu Charbonneau and percussionist Julien Poissant, formed Torngat, his longest standing musical project.  The band self-released music for several years before signing with the Alien8 label. 

In 2006 Amati performed with the Bell Orchestre at the Montreal Jazz Festival, and promoted the group's release Recording a Tape the Colour of the Light  with a March tour in Europe and a May tour of the US. In April he toured with Torngat in Eastern Canada, promoting the album La Rouge. In July a stand-in temporarily replaced Amato for Bell Orchestre's European tour while he participated in the recording of Torngat's 2007 album, You Could Be.

In 2007 Amato toured in March with Arcade Fire in Canada, promoting Neon Bible. Then he was on the road again with The Luyas in Ontario, to promote that band's recently released Faker Death.  That year Amato and the Bell Orchestra were nominated for a Juno Award for their work in Recording a Tape the Colour of the Light. 

Torngat's You Could Be was released in 2007, and late 2007 and early 2008 Amato toured with the band in Eastern Canada and New York City in support of that album. 

By 2009, Torngat had released another album, La Petite Nicole; the trio conducting spring and fall tours around Canada and the U. S. to promote it.  Amato also toured in April, May and July with Bell Orchestre in Canada and parts of the US to promote their release As Seen Through Windows, which won best instrumental album at the Juno Awards in 2010.

In 2011 Amato was on the road again with The Luyas from March to May promoting Too Beautiful to Work, touring in Canada and the US before moving on to Europe.

Discography

Studio albums
Torngat 
 Torngat (2002)
 Live at The Bread Factory (2004)
 La Rouge (2005)
 You Could Be (2007)
 La Petite Nicole (2009)

Bell Orchestre  
Recording a Tape the Colour of the Light (2005)
Who Designs Nature's How (2009) EP
As Seen Through Windows (2009)

The Luyas
Faker Death (2007)
Tiny Head (2009) self-released EP
Too Beautiful to Work (2011)

Studio Sessions
Islands - Return to the Sea (2006)

Evalyn Parry - Small Theatres (2007)

Amon Tobin - Foley Room (2007)

Sevens Project - Sevens Project (2010)

Ferriswheel - Woodsongs from the Backroom (2010)

Plants and Animals - La La Land (2010)

Snailhouse
Lies on the Prize (2008)
Monumental Moments (2010)

Arcade Fire
Funeral (2004)
Neon Bible (2007)
The Suburbs (2010)

Belgrave
Belgrave (2011)

Paper Beat Scissors
Paper Beat Scissors (2012)

Tambour - Farewell Museum (2016)

References

External links
Torngat
Bell Orchestre
Arcade Fire
The Luyas

Musicians from Montreal
Canadian people of Italian descent
Year of birth missing (living people)
Living people
Concordia University alumni
Canadian horn players
Bell Orchestre members